Willem Adams (born 23 February 1937, Meerveldhoven - died 5 January 2022, Eindhoven) is a Dutch painter. His work can be found in the Museum Kempenland and Van Abbemuseum in Eindhoven, the Stedelijk Museum Amsterdam in Amsterdam, the Museum Het Valkhof in Nijmegen, and the Noordbrabants Museum in 's-Hertogenbosch.

References Suid-Afrika
Vredendal Suid-Afrika

1937 births
Living people
Dutch painters
Dutch male painters
People from Veldhoven
20th-century Dutch people